Hampton is a town in Rockingham County, New Hampshire, United States. The population was 16,214 at the 2020 census. On the Atlantic Ocean coast, Hampton is home to Hampton Beach, a summer tourist destination.

The densely populated central part of the town, where 9,597 people resided at the 2020 census, is defined as the Hampton census-designated place (CDP) and centers on the intersection of U.S. 1 and NH 27.

History
First called the "Plantation of Winnacunnet", Hampton was one of four original New Hampshire townships chartered by the General Court of Massachusetts, which then held authority over the colony. Winnacunnet is an Algonquian Abenaki word meaning "pleasant pines" and is the name of the town's high school, serving students from Hampton and the surrounding towns of Seabrook, North Hampton, and Hampton Falls.

In March 1635, Richard Dummer and John Spencer of the Byfield section of Newbury, Massachusetts, came round in their shallop, coming ashore at the landing, and were much impressed by the location. Dummer, who was a member of the General Court, got that body to lay its claim to the section and plan a plantation here. The Massachusetts General Court of March 3, 1636, ordered that Dummer and Spencer be given power to "To presse men to build there a Bound house."

The town was settled in 1638 by a group of parishioners led by Oxford University graduate Reverend Stephen Bachiler, who had formerly preached at the settlement's namesake: Hampton, England. The town, incorporated in 1639, once included Seabrook, Kensington, Danville, Kingston, East Kingston, Sandown, North Hampton and Hampton Falls. On the 18th of September 1679, the Acts of Privy Council records that Stephen Bachiler's son-in-law, "Christopher Hussey of Hampton, Esquire",  was appointed by King Charles II to "govern the provence of New Hampshire" as a member of the newly established council of seven men.

Also among Hampton's earliest settlers was Thomas Leavitt, who previously had been among the first settlers at Exeter. His descendant Thomas Leavitt, Esq., lived in Hampton Falls, and was the leading Democratic politician in southern New Hampshire for many years. He made a noted early survey and plan of the town of Hampton in 1806. James Leavitt, of the same family, occupied the home which had previously belonged to Gen. Jonathan Moulton. Later members of the family ran Leavitts' Hampton Beach Hotel, a fixture in the area for generations.

Construction of the railroad in the 1850s, as well as the Exeter and Hampton Trolley line, made Hampton's oceanfront a popular resort. Hampton Beach remains a tourist destination, offering shops, restaurants, beaches, and summer seasonal housing.

Geography

Hampton is drained by the Hampton and Drakes rivers. The town lies fully within the New Hampshire Coastal watershed.

Adjacent municipalities
 North Hampton, New Hampshire (north)
 Seabrook, New Hampshire (south)
 Hampton Falls, New Hampshire (southwest)
 Exeter, New Hampshire (northwest)

Climate

Demographics

As of the census of 2010, there were 14,976 people, 6,868 households, and 4,079 families residing in the town. There were 9,921 housing units, of which 3,053, or 30.8%, were vacant. 2,221 of the vacant units were for seasonal or recreational uses. The racial makeup of the town was 96.1% white, 0.6% African American, 0.2% Native American, 1.2% Asian, 0.1% Native Hawaiian or Pacific Islander, 0.5% some other race, and 1.3% from two or more races. 1.7% of the population were Hispanic or Latino of any race.

Of the 6,868 households, 23.2% had children under the age of 18 living with them, 47.2% were headed by married couples living together, 8.3% had a female householder with no husband present, and 40.6% were non-families. 33.7% of all households were made up of individuals, and 12.2% were someone living alone who was 65 years of age or older. The average household size was 2.16, and the average family size was 2.77.

In the town, 17.5% of the population were under the age of 18, 7.0% were from 18 to 24, 22.3% from 25 to 44, 35.1% from 45 to 64, and 18.2% were 65 years of age or older. The median age was 47.0 years. For every 100 females, there were 99.4 males. For every 100 females age 18 and over, there were 99.0 males.

For the period 2011–2015, the estimated median annual income for a household was $76,836, and the median income for a family was $98,642. Male full-time workers had a median income of $65,519 versus $51,009 for females. The per capita income for the town was $45,189. 5.9% of the population and 4.7% of families were below the poverty line. 5.9% of the population under the age of 18 and 2.5% of those 65 or older were living in poverty.

Education

Hampton is part of School Administrative Unit 90, which covers the elementary and middle schools, and SAU 21 which includes Winnacunnet High School, a regional high school serving Hampton and several surrounding communities.

Sites of interest

 Benjamin James House (1723)
 Hampton Beach State Park
 Hampton Beach Casino Ballroom

Notable people 

 Bill Alfonso (born 1957), professional wrestling personality
 Stephen Bachiler (1561–1656), English clergyman; town founder
 Eunice "Goody" Cole (–1680), the only woman convicted of witchcraft in New Hampshire
 Henry Dearborn (1751–1829), physician, general and 5th U.S. Secretary of War
 Abraham Drake (1715–1781), Continental Army during the Revolutionary War and politician
 Jimmy Dunn, stand-up comedian, actor
 Christopher Hussey (1599–1686), English nobleman, one of the original founders of Nantucket, Massachusetts
 Thomas Leavitt (1616–1696), early settler
 Paul Maher Jr. (born 1963), author
 Stephen E. Merrill (1946–2020), 77th governor of New Hampshire
 Jonathan Moulton (1726–1787), Revolutionary War era brigadier general
 Jane Pierce (1806–1863), First Lady of the United States, wife of Franklin Pierce
 Robert Preston (1929–2021), businessman and New Hampshire state senator
 Trish Regan (born 1972), business news broadcaster
 Tristram Shaw (1786–1843), U.S. congressman

References

External links

 
 Hampton Beach State Park
 Hampton Historical Society
 Lane Memorial Library, Hampton's public library (with town historical information)
 New Hampshire Economic and Labor Market Information Bureau Profile
 Winnacunnet High School
 Hampton Union, local newspaper

 
Towns in Rockingham County, New Hampshire
Populated places established in 1638
Towns in New Hampshire
Populated coastal places in New Hampshire
1638 establishments in the Thirteen Colonies